Bagh Lingampally is a commercial and residential neighbourhood of Hyderabad, Telangana, India. It has become one of the many major centers of Hyderabad. It has been a home to some Nawabs in the past and this area used to be full of fruit gardens belonging to them, from where prefix ‘Bagh' (meaning gardern) is derived. The place had a small village called Lingampally which had a tank where queens would bathe. The locality has gained importance due to close proximity to RTC X Roads, Chikkadpally, Barkatpura, Himayathnagar, Nallakunta and Koti. This suburb is a mixture of the Old and New City cultures of Hyderabad. There is a vegetable market on Saturdays.

Commercial
Bagh Lingampally has a multitude of shops throughout the stretch with numerous chat bandars, fast food centers, bakeries, tea stalls, pan shops, juice centers and restaurants.

Transportation
Bagh Lingampally is connected by TSRTC buses with a Bus depot located there. There is a MMTS train station at Kachiguda and Vidyanagar. This place also contains travel agencies.

Educational institutions
Baghlingampally is home to reputable educational institutions such as Nrupatunga Junior and Degree College, Dr. B.R. Ambedkar's institution
Specialized in Law & Management Studies and other institutions like St. Gabriel's , Gowtham Model School too exist

Cultural Hub
This suburb is rich in culture. It contains various temples (Sri Anjaneyaswamy Temple and Sri SaiBaba Temple) and auditoriums (Sundarayya Vignana Kendram). Sundarya Park is considered a local landmark of this suburb. Sarojini Cricket Academy is considered one of the best cricket coaching academies in Hyderabad.

Future Developments
There is a proposal from the TSHB to construct a multi storied township on the site of the Housing Board Flats. The current owners would receive a flat in the proposed development. There are proposals for constructing malls in the area.

Distance to key locations
Imliban Bus Stand - 3 km
Jubilee Bus Stand - 5.2 km
Secunderabad Station - 3.6 km
Panjagutta X Roads - 5.6 km
Kukatpally HB - 14.9 km
Begumpet Airport - 5.9 km
Trimulgherry RTA - 7.3 km
Madhapur (Cyber Towers) - 12.9 km
Dilsukhnagar - 4.6 km

References 

Neighbourhoods in Hyderabad, India